The 2020–21 Nottingham Forest Football Club season was the club's 155th year since their formation and the club's 13th consecutive season in the EFL Championship, the second tier of English football. In addition to the EFL Championship, they played in two domestic cup competitions; they were eliminated in the fourth round of the FA Cup and the first round of the EFL Cup.

Players

New contracts

Transfers

In

Out

Loans in

Loans out

Competitions

Overview

EFL Championship

League table

Results summary

Results by matchday

Matches
The 2020–21 season fixtures were released on 21 August.

FA Cup

The third round draw was made on 30 November, with Premier League and EFL Championship clubs all entering the competition. The draw for the fourth and fifth round were made on 11 January, conducted by Peter Crouch.

EFL Cup

The first round draw was made on 18 August, live on Sky Sports, by Paul Merson.

Statistics

Goals and appearances

|}

Notes
This season is notable for all games being played without spectators, due to the Covid-19 pandemic

References

External links

Nottingham Forest F.C. seasons
Nottingham Forest F.C.